Douglas George Elliot (12 February 1917 – 25 March 1989) was an Australian politician.

He was born in Caulfield to John and Laurel Elliot; his father was a sales manager. He attended Scotch College until the age of thirteen, after which he attended night school while working. He joined J. C. Williamson's theatre company, and then from 1934 became a radio and television announcer. He worked at many Melbourne radio stations including: 3AK, 3AW, 3KZ, 3UZ and 3XY.

On 12 January 1940 he married Heather Bernice Pearce, with whom he had three children. He served with the Royal Australian Air Force during World War II. He worked for HSV-7, the Seven Network channel in Melbourne, first for the Mickey Mouse Club and then as an announcer for World of Sport. In 1946 he had joined the Labor Party; he ran as a candidate for the federal seat of Maribyrnong in 1958 but was defeated. In 1960 he was elected to the Victorian Legislative Council in a by-election for Melbourne Province. He served as a backbencher until 1979, when he lost preselection to Evan Walker. However, that year he was elected to Essendon City Council, and he was mayor from 1982 to 1983. Elliot died in 1989.

References

1917 births
1989 deaths
Australian Labor Party members of the Parliament of Victoria
Members of the Victorian Legislative Council
20th-century Australian politicians
Royal Australian Air Force personnel of World War II
Royal Australian Air Force airmen
Military personnel from Melbourne